Rippon Lea Estate is a heritage-listed historic house and gardens located in Elsternwick, Melbourne, Victoria, Australia. It is in the care of the National Trust of Australia. It was added to the Australian National Heritage List on 11 August 2006.

History 

The Rippon Lea Estate was built in 1868 for Sir Frederick Sargood, a wealthy Melbourne businessman, politician and philanthropist. Located about 8 kilometres from the Melbourne central business district, he contracted a two-storey, 15 room house be built. An extensive pleasure garden was laid out around the house, together with glasshouses, vegetable gardens and orchards. The gardens were designed to be self-sufficient as regards water, and the large man-made lake on the property was designed to store storm water run-off from the surrounding area. From 1881 William Sangster was engaged as a consultant by Frederick Sargood for significant re-design work. In 1882 the Nursery lawn replaced flower beds. In 1883 the lakes were significantly expanded and the hill and lookout were created.

The Sargood family lived at Rippon Lea until Frederick's death in 1903, and over the years extended the house on several occasions. The greatest structural changes occurred in 1897 when the house was extended to the north, and a tower was added. The style of the house has been described as "polychromatic romanesque" and the architect, Joseph Reed, was said to have been inspired by the architecture of the Lombardy region of northern Italy. The house also contained many other innovations; it was one of the first in Australia to be lit by electricity, produced by its own generators, and Sargood employed a full-time electrician to maintain the system, and the fittings included an electrically powered bell system to communicate with the servants quarters and kitchens below stairs.

On Frederick's death in 1903, the property was sold to a consortium of real estate developers who had plans to demolish the house and subdivide the land. Elsternwick at this time was a new suburb on the outskirts of Melbourne; 35 years earlier when the Sargoods bought the land, it had been well outside the built-up area of Melbourne.

The house was empty for six years, while the developers sold off various parcels of land, particularly the orchards and paddocks. However, before the final carve-up of the estate could be undertaken, the leader of the consortium, Sir Thomas Bent, died and the property was put on the market in 1910.

It was bought by Ben and Agnes Nathan, who owned the Maples chain of furniture stores in Melbourne. The Nathans lived there until Ben's death in 1935. The property then passed to their eldest daughter, Louisa, along with a legacy of £1 million.

Louisa (married name, Mrs Timothy Jones) was a leading figure in the Melbourne social set in the 1930s. She undertook extensive remodelling and renovation of the house to allow her to entertain on a lavish scale.  The interior of the house was redecorated in a restrained classical 1930s style, drawing heavily on Hollywood film style of the 1930s and Syrie Maugham's "all white room" as influences. These renovations substantially altered most of the surviving Victorian features of the house—for example, the wallpaper in the entrance hall and corridors (originally embossed in gold) was over-painted in white, as were the marble columns around the main entrance.

Mrs Jones also installed a new modern kitchen on the ground level and the original basement kitchen and service areas were closed up, which preserved many of the surviving 19th century features of this section of the house, including the cool room, the wine cellar and the large fuel stove.

In preparation for the 1956 Olympic Games in Melbourne, a section of the property was compulsorily acquired by the Victorian government to house a new television studio complex for the Australian Broadcasting Corporation (ABC). The Rippon Lea studio became the ABC's Melbourne studio and in later years were used as the production centre for many renowned ABC programs including Bellbird, Countdown, The Big Gig and The Late Show.

Another section of the property was compulsorily acquired by the state government a few years later and Mrs Jones fought a long-running legal action against it. She eventually settled with the government, agreeing that, on her death the house and the land still in her possession would be bequeathed to the National Trust. With Mrs Jones death on 27 July 1972, the house and gardens were reunited with the disputed acquisition, saving the estate from the threat of sale and subdivision and allowing the public to enjoy the estate in perpetuity.
During the 1970s and 1980s the Vernon Family resided in the gate house.

Of particular note in the grounds are the lake, the spectacular iron-framed fernery, the swimming pool and associated ballroom (1939, now leased to Showtime Event Group for social functions) and the stable complex (1868).  The rooms of the basement kitchen complex are also of special interest, having been built in the 1880s and then abandoned in 1938 following the installation of a modern kitchen on the ground floor.  Today they are a rare surviving Australian example of a 19th-century kitchen suite; comprising kitchen, scullery, pantries, cool rooms, servants' hall and wine cellar.

References

External links
Official Rippon Lea website operated by the National Trust
Photo galleries of Rippon Lea Estate and function hire details
 Culture Victoria – story and historical images of Rippon Lea and the families who lived there

Heritage-listed buildings in Melbourne
Australian National Heritage List
Gardens in Victoria (Australia)
Victorian architecture in Victoria (Australia)
Historic house museums in Victoria (Australia)
National Trust of Australia
Houses in Melbourne
1868 establishments in Australia
Landmarks in Melbourne
Elsternwick, Victoria
Buildings and structures in the City of Glen Eira
Houses completed in 1868